Blake Gerald Weiman (born November 5, 1995) is an American professional baseball pitcher in the Seattle Mariners organization.

Amateur career
Weiman attended Columbine High School in Columbine, Colorado. He signed to play college baseball at the University of Kansas. During his high school career, he played in three Colorado Rockies Futures games. In 2014, as a senior, he went 7–0 with a 1.40 ERA and was named to the All-Colorado baseball team. Undrafted out of high school in the 2014 Major League Baseball draft, he enrolled at Kansas.

In 2015, as a freshman at Kansas, Weiman appeared in 21 games (seven starts), going 2–7 with a 6.75 ERA. As a sophomore in 2016, he became a full-time starter, appearing in 17 games in which he went 2–7 with a 6.82 ERA. In 2017, in Weiman's junior season, he moved to the bullpen where he greatly improved, pitching to a 5–1 record with a 2.80 ERA, striking out 55 batters in 45 relief innings pitched. After his junior year, he was drafted by the Pittsburgh Pirates in the eighth round of the 2017 Major League Baseball draft.

Professional career

Pittsburgh Pirates organization
Weiman signed with Pittsburgh and made his professional debut with the West Virginia Black Bears of the Class A Short Season New York–Penn League, going 4–3 with a 3.78 ERA in 21 relief appearances. He began the 2018 season with the West Virginia Power of the Class A South Atlantic League and was promoted to the Bradenton Marauders of the Class A-Advanced Florida State League and the Altoona Curve of the Class AA Eastern League during the year. In 67 relief innings pitched between the three clubs, he went 4–1 with a 2.42 ERA and 77 strikeouts. After the season, he played for the Surprise Saguaros of the Arizona Fall League and was named to the Fall Stars Game. Weiman was a non-roster invitee to 2019 spring training. He returned to Altoona to begin 2019 and was promoted to the Indianapolis Indians of the Class AAA International League in June after pitching to a 1.86 ERA over  relief innings. Over eight relief appearances with Indianapolis, Weiman went 0–1 with a 4.63 ERA. He missed nearly all of the last two months of the season due to injury.

Weiman did not play a minor league game in 2020 since the season was cancelled due to the COVID-19 pandemic. For the 2021 season, he returned to Indianapolis. He missed playing time in August due to injury. Over 35 relief appearances, Weiman went 5–0 with a 4.76 ERA and 45 strikeouts over  innings. He returned to the Indians to begin the 2022 season. On June 27, he was released.

Seattle Mariners organization
On July 6, 2022, the Seattle Mariners signed Weiman to a minor league contract and assigned him to the Double-A Arkansas Travelers. Over 33 relief appearances between the Indians and Travelers, he went 3-1 with a 4.47 ERA, 42 strikeouts, and six walks over  innings. On December 5, Weiman re-signed with the Mariners on a minor league deal.

References

External links

Minor league baseball players
1995 births
Living people
Baseball pitchers
Baseball players from Colorado
Kansas Jayhawks baseball players
West Virginia Power players
West Virginia Black Bears players
Bradenton Marauders players
Altoona Curve players
Indianapolis Indians players
Surprise Saguaros players